The Zimbabwean national cricket team toured Sri Lanka in December 1983 and played two first-class matches and three Limited Overs Internationals (LOI) against the Sri Lankan national cricket team. At this time, Sri Lanka had just achieved Test status but Zimbabwe had not. Sri Lanka were captained by Ranjan Madugalle and Zimbabwe by John Traicos. The Zimbabwe team played two first-class matches versus the Sri Lanka Board President's XI at Tyronne Fernando Stadium and a Sri Lankan XI at Paikiasothy Saravanamuttu Stadium. Both games were drawn. Zimbabwe also played three limited overs matches against the Sri Lankan XI.

References

External links

1983 in Sri Lankan cricket
1983 in Zimbabwean cricket
Zimbabwean cricket tours of Sri Lanka
International cricket competitions from 1980–81 to 1985
Sri Lankan cricket seasons from 1972–73 to 1999–2000